Koriten is a village in the municipality of Krushari, in Dobrich Province, in northeastern Bulgaria.

Koriten Glacier on Graham Land, Antarctica is named after the village.

References

Villages in Dobrich Province